Kenny Bundy (born March 9, 1981, in Tulsa, Oklahoma) is an American former soccer player who is currently the head coach of Houston Dynamo 2 in MLS Next Pro.

Career

College and amateur
Bundy grew up in Bixby, Oklahoma, and played college soccer at the University of North Carolina at Greensboro from 1999 to 2003. During the 2003 collegiate off season he spent the summer with the Carolina Dynamo of the USL Premier Development League.

Professional
Bundy signed as a free agent with the Dallas Sidekicks of the Major Indoor Soccer League on October 2, 2003. He spent the 2003–2004 season in Dallas, but the team withdrew from the league at the end of the season.  The Chicago Storm selected Bundy in the third round of the Dispersal Draft, but he did not sign with them.

Instead, he signed with the Wilmington Hammerheads of the USL Second Division, where he has remained ever since, clocking over 80 games for the team in four seasons.

After a year out of soccer in 2008 Bundy returned to the Hammerheads for the 2009 season. He was subsequently named to the 2009 USL2 All-League First Team.

Coaching
In addition to his playing career, Bundy previously was a coach with Developmental Elite Coaching in Wilmington.

Bundy was named head coach of Houston Dynamo 2 in MLS Next Pro. When Dynamo first team head coach Paulo Nagamura was fired 29 games into the 2022 season, Bundy assumed interim duties on September 5.

Honors

Wilmington Hammerheads
USL Second Division Regular Season Champions (1): 2009

Dallas Sidekicks

Scored the 3,500th goal in Dallas Sidekicks history.

References

External links
 Wilmington Hammerheads bio

1981 births
Living people
Sportspeople from Tulsa, Oklahoma
American soccer players
Soccer players from Oklahoma
USL League Two players
USL Second Division players
Wilmington Hammerheads FC players
North Carolina Fusion U23 players
Dallas Sidekicks (2001–2008 MISL) players
UNC Greensboro Spartans men's soccer players
Houston Dynamo FC non-playing staff
Association football midfielders
Major Indoor Soccer League (2001–2008) players
People from Bixby, Oklahoma
American soccer coaches